Russians in the United Kingdom are Russians, or the persons born in the Russian Empire, the Soviet Union or the Russian Federation, who are or were citizens of or residents of the United Kingdom.

Settlement and population numbers
The 2001 UK census recorded 15,160 residents born in Russia. The 2011 census recorded 36,313 people born in Russia resident in England, 687 in Wales, 2,180 in Scotland and 349 in Northern Ireland.

The Office for National Statistics estimates that 73,000 people born in Russia were resident in the UK in 2020. Estimates published by The Guardian suggest that the resident population of London born in Russia was over 150,000 in 2014.
The rise in population has led to jocular nicknames for London such as "Londongrad" and "Moscow-on-the-Thames".

Education
In London, in particular Notting Hill Gate there are a number of Russian schools aimed at transmitting Russian language and culture to the children of Russian immigrant parents.

The Russian Embassy School in London is a Russian international school in the UK’s capital city.

History

Russian revolutionaries
After the abolition of slavery, Catholic emancipation and Jewish emancipation in the early 19th century, Britain came to be seen in Europe as a liberal destination, attracting free thinkers who were considered dangerous by the monarchies of continental Europe. Alexander Herzen, a writer considered to be the "father of Russian socialism", lived in London for 13 years. He established the first Russian-language printing house outside Russia Free Russian Press, first at Judd Street and later moving to the Caledonian Road. Herzen's most influential publication, devised with the help of another Russian immigrant poet Nikolai Ogarev, was  newsletter. Notable Russian anarchists Peter Kropotkin and Mikhail Bakunin lived and worked in London in the late 19th century. Freedom Press anarchist publishing house co-founded by Kropotkin in Whitechapel still operates as of 2022.

Due to the political freedom in Britain, London will become central to the Russian revolutionary thinkers once again in the 20th century. Vladimir Lenin lived in London in 1902–1903, publishing a revolutionary journal  in a building in Clerkenwell that later became a home of the Marx Memorial Library. The congress of Russian revolutionaries held in the Three Johns pub in Islington in 1903 became a critical point of division of the movement to hardline Bolsheviks, who would later establish the Soviet Union, and Mensheviks. The 1907 Bolshevik party congress was held in Hackney and was attended by future leaders of the Bolshevik revolution including, besides Lenin, Leon Trotsky, Joseph Stalin, Grigory Zinoviev, Lev Kamenev, Maxim Litvinov and writer Maxim Gorky.

Jewish emigration

Russian Jews emigrated to the United Kingdom beginning in the late 19th century to seek refuge from the persecution in Russian Empire and Eastern Europe. It's estimated that 150,000 Jewish people relocated to Britain between 1881 and 1914. Slonim-born Michael Marks settled in Leeds where he co-founded Marks & Spencer retail chain in 1894. Isaac Moses and his brother founded Moss Bros Group in Houndsditch. Montague Burton, then known as Montague Ossinsky, came to England from Lithuania, founding Burton in Sheffield in 1904, opening shops in Chesterfield, Manchester, Leeds and Mansfield within a year. Burton became the biggest retail empire in Europe by 1925. Most Jewish immigrants, however, had a much harder life. Facing language barrier and unable to work on Saturdays for religious reasons, they were often employed by the London's East End sweatshops run by Jewish entrepreneurs. Jewish immigrants to London built a thriving clothes trade in Houndsditch and Petticoat Lane.

The hardships prompted some Jews to become revolutionaries. A pioneer of Jewish socialism Aaron Liebermann came to London from Saint Petersburg in 1875. He organised the first Jewish worker's organisation Hebrew Socialist Union in London, however, the initiative wasn't supported by the Jewish establishment and the socialist organisation was short-lived. Morris Winchevsky, who moved to London from Lithuania, published a socialist Yiddish newspaper  from the premises in Commercial Street.

Biochemist Chaim Weizmann came to Britain from Russia in 1904. He developed a method of producing cordite explosive that was essential to the Britain's World War I effort. His industrial success resulted in meeting then Foreign Secretary Arthur Balfour and he is believed to have influenced Balfour Declaration, which led to the creation of Israel.

Exiles from the Soviet Union

Notable people

This is a list of Russian expatriates in the United Kingdom and Britons of Russian ancestry.

Arts
Serge Chermayeff, architect
Sergei Fyodorov, icon painter
Theodore Komisarjevsky, theatrical director and designer
Lilia Kopylova, dancer
Andrew Garfield, his family was Russian-Jewish ancestry.
Berthold Lubetkin, architect
Helen Mirren, actress
Viktoria Mullova, violinist
Seva Novgorodsev, radio presenter
Oxxxymiron, rap singer.
Sergei Pavlenko, portrait painter
Sir Peter Ustinov, actor, writer and raconteur

Business

Boris Berezovsky, businessman
Evgeny Chichvarkin, entrepreneur
Evgeny Lebedev, businessman
Vladimir Raitz, founder of the Horizon Holiday Group

Military and espionage
Vladimir Peniakoff, Lieutenant-Colonel of the British Army, Distinguished Service Order, Military Cross
Pavel Chichagov, Commander and an Admiral of the Imperial Russian Navy under Alexander I. The son of the son of Admiral Vasili Chichagov and his English wife.
Rudolf Abel, Soviet spy during the Cold War, born in Newcastle-upon-Tyne as Vilyam Genrikhovich Fisher.
Oleg Gordievsky, former senior Soviet intelligence officer 
Alexander Litvinenko, British naturalised Russian defector and former officer of the Russian FSB secret service who specialised in tackling organised crime.
Sergei Skripal, former Russian military intelligence officer who acted as a double agent for the UK's intelligence services.

Science and humanities
Isaiah Berlin, renowned social and political theorist, and historian
Konstantin Novoselov, Nobel Prize-winning physicist
Andre Geim, Nobel Prize-winning physicist
Alexandra Tolstoy, businesswoman, fellow of the Royal Geographical Society
Nikolai Tolstoy, historian
Paul Vinogradoff, historian-medievalist
Nicholas Zernov, Orthodox theologian

Sports
Marfa Ekimova, rhythmic gymnast
Alexander Obolensky, international rugby union player

Monuments

This is a list of monuments to Russians in the United Kingdom.

19th century 
 Hoy monument, Isle of Wight – commemorates the visit of Alexander I of Russia to Great Britain in 1814
 Russian Memorial, Lewes

Second World War 
 Tempsford Memorial, Bedfordshire – memorial to women who served as secret agents in occupied Europe during the Second World War, including four Soviet NKVD agents
 Twelve Responses to Tragedy, South Kensington – commemorates people forcibly repatriated to the Soviet Union and Yugoslavia as a result of the Yalta Conference at the conclusion of the Second World War.

Personal monuments 
 Statue of Yuri Gagarin, Greenwich
 Vladimir Lenin Bust, Islington – commissioned by the UK Government during the war in tribute to the efforts of the Soviet Union. It was placed in Holford Square (briefly Lenin's home when he lived in London) and unveiled in 1942. It was a supposed focal point of a new housing development to be named 'Lenin Court' although the choice of Lenin proved unpopular with the local community and the bust was frequently daubed with anti-communist slogans. Architect Berthold Lubetkin had the bust removed and when the housing development was completed in the late 1940s, it was renamed 'Bevin Court'. The bust was displayed in Islington Town Hall for many years and is now on permanent display in the Islington Museum.
 Carved portrait of Dmitri Mendeleev on the Imperial Chemical House façade, Millbank
 Statue of Peter the Great, Deptford

See also

Little Russia, London
Other White
Russian money in London
Russian oligarchs
Russia–United Kingdom relations

References

Further reading

 – bibliography on formative years of Yevgeny Zamyatin in Newcastle

External links
Russian community associations in Britain
Map of Russian places in the UK

 
 
Russia–United Kingdom relations
Immigration to the United Kingdom by country of origin